Chung Hsin-yu (born July 9, 1983), also known as Sasa or Sha Sha, is a Taiwanese television host, actress and entrepreneur. She began her career as a model and is best known for hosting the food travel show Super Taste and the reality show Hi, Come in.

Other ventures 
Chung opened a café, Halo, in Taipei, in 2014. She previously owned a fashion outlet, also named Halo, from 2008 to 2015.

Filmography

Hosting

Television series

Film

Music video appearances

Published works

Awards and nominations

References

External links 

 
 
 

1983 births
Living people
Taiwanese television presenters
Taiwanese television actresses
Taiwanese television personalities
21st-century Taiwanese actresses
Taiwanese women in business
Taipei City University of Science and Technology alumni
Businesspeople from Taipei